Daldalita is a Philippine television musical drama fantasy series broadcast by GMA Network. Directed by Don Michael Perez, it stars Jillian Ward in the title role. It premiered on October 17, 2011 on the network's Telebabad line up replacing Futbolilits. The series concluded on February 3, 2012 with a total of 80 episodes. It was replaced by Alice Bungisngis and Her Wonder Walis in its timeslot.

The series is streaming online on YouTube.

Cast and characters

Lead cast
Jillian Ward as Daldalita / Lolita Matias

Supporting cast
Ogie Alcasid as Mateo Matia
Manilyn Reynes as Katrina de Leon
Rufa Mae Quinto as Cherry
Julie Anne San Jose as Marga de Leon
Elmo Magalona as Gino Delgado
Isabel Oli as May
Marc Abaya as Sam

Recurring cast
Luigi Revilla as Dado
Timmy Cruz as Lupe
Spanky Manikan as Manny Manuel
Arnold Reyes as Arthur
Jinky Oda as Tisay
Joey Parasas Chi-Chi
Eunice Lagunsad as Tessa

Voice cast
Candy Pangilinan as Daisy
Pekto as Kirat
Wally Bayola as Bobby

Guest cast
Donna Cruz as Carmela de Leon-Matias
Isabel Granada as Demi
Chuckie Dreyfus as Ashton
Baby O'brien as Lola Barbara
MM Magno as Johann
Milkcah Wynne Nacion as Becky / fake Lolita de Leon-Matias
Sasha Baldoza
Sean Samonte as Dwayne
Angel Satsumi
Raymart Santiago as Tarzan

Production
Actress Gelli de Belen was initially hired for the role of Katrina de Leon. De Belen later left the series to work for TV5. Manilyn Reynes served as her replacement.

Ratings
According to AGB Nielsen Philippines' Mega Manila household television ratings, the pilot episode of Daldalita earned a 19.3% rating. While the final episode scored a 17% rating.

References

External links
 

2011 Philippine television series debuts
2012 Philippine television series endings
Fantasy television series
Filipino-language television shows
GMA Network drama series
Philippine musical television series
Television shows set in the Philippines